Saros cycle series 150 for solar eclipses occurs at the Moon's descending node, repeating every 18 years, 11 days, containing 71 events. All eclipses in this series occurs at the Moon's descending node.

This solar saros is linked to Lunar Saros 143.

Saros 150

Saros 150 
It is a part of Saros cycle 150, repeating every 18 years, 11 days, containing 71 events. The series started with partial solar eclipse on August 24, 1729. It contains annular eclipses from April 22, 2126 through June 22, 2829. There are no total eclipses in this series. The series ends at member 71 as a partial eclipse on September 29, 2991. The longest duration of annularity will be 9 minutes, 58 seconds on December 19, 2522.
<noinclude>

Umbral eclipses
Umbral eclipses (annular, total and hybrid) can be further classified as either: 1) Central (two limits), 2) Central (one limit) or 3) Non-Central (one limit). The statistical distribution of these classes in Saros series 150 appears in the following table.

Events

References
 http://eclipse.gsfc.nasa.gov/SEsaros/SEsaros150.html

External links
Saros cycle 150 - Information and visualization

Solar saros series